Paul David Heaton (born 9 May 1962) is an English singer-songwriter. He was the frontman of the Housemartins, who had success with the singles "Happy Hour" and the UK number one "Caravan of Love" in 1986 before disbanding in 1988. He then formed The Beautiful South, whose debut single and album were released in 1989 to commercial success. They had a series of hits throughout the 1990s, including the number-one single "A Little Time". They disbanded in 2007. He subsequently pursued a solo career, which produced three albums, and in 2014 he released What Have We Become?, a collaboration with former Beautiful South vocalist Jacqui Abbott. As of 2022, he has recorded four more albums with her: Wisdom, Laughter and Lines in 2015, Crooked Calypso in 2017, Manchester Calling in 2020 and N.K-Pop in 2022.

British newspaper The Guardian has described Heaton as "one of our finest songwriters: his music reveals an exuberant ear for melody, his lyrics a keen eye and a brilliant wit". AllMusic said: "The warm, mellifluous voice of Paul Heaton often masks the jagged satirical content of his lyrics."

Early life
Paul David Heaton was born in Bromborough, Cheshire (now Merseyside)  on 9 May 1962 to parents Doris and Horace Heaton. Heaton has two older brothers Mark Heaton and Adrian Heaton. At the age of four his family relocated to Sheffield. While living in Sheffield, Heaton became interested in football, and while his elder brothers elected to watch Sheffield Wednesday, Heaton chose to support Sheffield United. After moving to Sheffield, Heaton's father took a job in management and Heaton described his childhood as being "fairly middle class, although you wouldn't know it given the schools I went to and the friends I had".

After a childhood in Sheffield, Heaton moved to Chipstead, Surrey during his adolescent years, an early life Heaton described as "bred in Sheffield, fed in Surrey". Whilst in Surrey he, with his brother Adrian, formed their first band "Tools Down" with friends John Box and Stuart Mair. After leaving Surrey, Heaton spent time hitch-hiking around Europe before moving to Hull in 1983, where he formed the Housemartins. Heaton also lived in Leeds for a year.

Throughout his childhood, Heaton's main interest was football, and he regularly attended Sheffield United games. Heaton played over 700 competitive games at junior and amateur level, often insisting on driving back from gigs on a Friday or Saturday night to attend his Saturday and Sunday matches.

The Housemartins

Heaton, then billing himself as P.d. Heaton, formed the Housemartins in the early 1980s. This band featured Stan Cullimore on guitar, Ted Key on bass and Hugh Whitaker on drums. Shortly afterwards Key left the band and was replaced with Norman Cook. The Housemartins released a number of singles and two studio albums, London 0 Hull 4 and The People Who Grinned Themselves to Death. Their most popular hit was an a cappella cover version of "Caravan of Love" (originally by Isley-Jasper-Isley), which reached number 1 on 16 December 1986, their only number 1 hit in the UK. For the second album Hugh Whitaker was replaced with Dave Hemingway on drums. Shortly afterwards the Housemartins split up.

The Housemartins' lyrics were a mixture of Marxist politics and Christianity (the inner sleeve of London 0 Hull 4 contained the mantra "Take Jesus – Take Marx – Take Hope").

The Beautiful South

In 1988, Heaton formed the Beautiful South. The initial lineup consisted of Heaton, Dave Rotheray on lead guitar, former Housemartins roadie Sean Welch on bass, David Stead on drums and Housemartins former drummer Dave Hemingway, now in the role of joint lead singer and frontman. The writing partnership of Heaton and Rotheray proved very successful. The Beautiful South released two top ten singles, "Song for Whoever" and "You Keep It All In"; the latter featured Irish singer Briana Corrigan on vocals. In 1989, the band released an album, Welcome to the Beautiful South. The band's biggest success to date is the single "A Little Time", released in 1990; it reached number 1 on the UK chart.

The band went on to release eight more albums, including two (1996's Blue Is the Colour and 1998's Quench) that reached the number 1 on the UK Albums Chart, as well as releasing the best-of compilation Carry on up the Charts, which also reached number 1 and achieved platinum status, before the band split up.

After a band meeting on 30 January 2007, they decided to split. They released a statement on 31 January, in which their reasons for splitting were "musical similarities". On an interview with BBC Breakfast in July 2008, Heaton clarified this by saying that the Beautiful South had made similar-sounding albums for the past ten years.

Solo albums
In 2001, Heaton released a solo album using the persona of Biscuit Boy (a.k.a. Crackerman). This double name, including the parenthetical a.k.a., was the official project name on all early releases.

The solo album, called Fat Chance, was not a commercial success, peaking at number 95 for one week on the UK albums chart. Also, "Mitch", the lone single credited to Biscuit Boy (a.k.a. Crackerman), reached only number 75 in the UK Singles Chart.

In an attempt to relaunch the album, Mercury Records re-issued Fat Chance in 2002. The album featured new artwork, and was now credited to Paul Heaton. However, this record charted even lower in the album chart, hitting number 168. "The Perfect Couple", a single pulled from this re-release also did poorly, peaking at number 102 in the UK. Heaton subsequently rejoined the Beautiful South from 2002 to 2007.

With the 2007 dissolution of the Beautiful South, Heaton formed a new band, The Sound of Paul Heaton.

Heaton's second solo album, The Cross-Eyed Rambler, was released on 7 July 2008, preceded by the single "Mermaids and Slaves" on 30 June, and he toured in support of it throughout July. The album charted at number 43.

Heaton released his third solo album, Acid Country, in September 2010.

The 8th
In 2011, the Manchester International Festival endorsed the writing by Heaton of an anthology of songs based on the 7 deadly sins, to be called The 8th. The song was broken down into a section for each sin, which was to be performed by a different artist. The singers for the original piece were: Wayne Gidden, Aaron Wright, King Creosote, Simon Aldred, Cherry Ghost, Jacqui Abbott, Yvonne Shelton and Mike Greaves. The individual sections were incorporated with a narration written by Che Walker and performed by Reg E. Cathey.

The 8th debuted in July 2011 at the Festival Pavilion Theatre in Manchester's Albert Square. Six further performances took place in the summer of 2012.

Along with the live shows in July 2012, a recording of The 8th was released on a CD/DVD format, including tracks by Simon Aldred of Cherry Ghost, Aaron Wright, Mike Greaves, Yvonne Shelton, Jacqui Abbott and Heaton himself.

Paul Heaton and Jacqui Abbott
Heaton reunited with former Beautiful South vocalist Jacqui Abbott in 2013 to record new material. What Have We Become? was released on 19 May 2014. The album reached number 3 in the UK Albums Chart. The album contained 12 new songs (the deluxe version an additional four new songs). The majority of the songs were written by Heaton and his current songwriting partner Jonny Lexus, with "D.I.Y", "When it Was Ours" and "You're Gonna Miss Me" written by Heaton only.

On working with Abbott again, Heaton said: "Working with Jacqui again was like going into your garage and discovering a beautiful, covered up Rolls-Royce that hadn't been started in years. Jacqui is one of the best singers I've worked with and is also part of my past. It was only a matter of time before I asked her."

On Sunday 29 June 2014 they appeared live on BBC Two at Glastonbury Festival performing acoustic versions of second single "Moulding of a Fool" and a cover version of Kenny Rogers & Dolly Parton's "Islands in the Stream". During the summer of 2014 Paul and Jacqui performed at a series of festivals across the UK and Ireland including Glastonbury Festival, Latitude Festival, V Festival and Festival N°6.

On 11 November 2014, BBC Radio 2 broadcast a world premiere of "Real Hope", featuring the Grimethorpe Colliery Band, from the deluxe edition of What Have We Become?.

Heaton and Abbott's next two albums together, Wisdom, Laughter and Lines (2015) and Crooked Calypso (2017), both reached the UK top 10, and their fourth, Manchester Calling (2020), became their first UK Number 1 album for over twenty years.

The Last King of Pop
On 16 November 2018, a career-spanning collection of Heaton's music titled The Last King Of Pop was released on the Virgin EMI label. It featured 23 of the songs written by Heaton throughout his career in the Housemartins, The Beautiful South, his solo years, and his collaboration with Jacqui Abbott.

The track listing included the Housemartins' 1985 debut single "Flag Day", The Beautiful South's "Don't Marry Her", "Rotterdam" and "Perfect 10" through to 2017's Heaton & Abbott single "I Gotta Praise" + a 2018 re-record by Paul and Jacqui of the Beautiful South song "A Little Time", and a brand new song, entitled "7' Singles".

The album reached Number 10 in the UK Charts and was certified Gold on 11 January 2019.

To coincide with the album release, Heaton and Abbott performed three shows at Sheffield City Hall, Blackpool Empress Ballroom and London's Royal Albert Hall, performing the album in full.

Following the success of the shows, it was announced that Heaton and Abbott would perform The Last King Of Pop at an outdoor headline show at Stockport County's Edgeley Park on 21 June 2019. All 15,000 tickets sold out and a second night was announced to take place on 20 June 2019. Richard Hawley was announced as special guest at both shows.

A television documentary covering Paul Heaton's life and career was broadcast on Wednesday 12 December 2018 on Channel 4. The documentary included archived material and interviews with many key figures from throughout Heaton's life.

Personal life
Heaton lives in Manchester with his wife and three children.

Heaton has on occasions referred to the Beautiful South as having a heavy drinking culture. Many songs by the Beautiful South, such as "Woman in the Wall", "Liars' Bar", "I May Be Ugly", "The Slide", "Look What I Found in My Beer" and "Old Red Eyes Is Back", have referred to alcoholism or drink-fuelled violence. 

In December 2011, Heaton purchased the lease of The Kings Arms public house, Bloom Street in Salford, Greater Manchester. He sold the pub in December 2015.

He is a keen collector and has a diverse range of collections including football memorabilia, crisp packets, beer mats, postcards and comics.

I'm 2022,he gave money to 60 pubs across the UK and Ireland to enable them to give free pints to celebrate his 60th birthday.

Other appearances
During the 1990s, Heaton regularly appeared on Football Italia, Channel 4's coverage of Italian Serie A football as a pre-match guest and was frequently introduced by host James Richardson as an 'Italian football expert'.

Heaton appeared on BBC One talking head programme Why We Love the Royle Family, along with Noel Gallagher, in his capacity as a fan of the television sitcom The Royle Family.

In May 2012, Heaton set off on his 50:50 cycle tour of British and Irish pubs, promoting his latest album, British pubs, and cycling. He covered  –  for each year of his life.

In February 2023, Heaton and his crisp packet collection appeared on the Channel 4 documentary Grayson Perry's Full English, with Heaton donating a display of Murphy’s Crisps flavours to Perry's exhibition of Englishness.

Discography

The Housemartins

 London 0 Hull 4
 The People Who Grinned Themselves to Death
 Now That's What I Call Quite Good

The Beautiful South

 Welcome to the Beautiful South
 Choke
 0898 Beautiful South
 Miaow
 Blue Is the Colour
 Quench
 Painting It Red
 Gaze
 Golddiggas, Headnodders and Pholk Songs
 Superbi

Compilations
Carry on up the Charts (1994)
Carry on up the Charts (1994) - 2CD Limited Edition
Solid Bronze (2001)
Gold (2006)
Soup (2007)
The BBC Sessions (2007) - 2-CD Set
Live at the BBC (2011) - 3CD+DVD Set

Paul Heaton (solo artist)

Studio albums
 Fat Chance (2001) as Biscuit Boy (AKA Crackerman)
 The Cross Eyed Rambler (2008)
 Acid Country (2010)
 Paul Heaton Presents the 8th (2012)
 What Have We Become? (2014) with Jacqui Abbott
 Wisdom, Laughter and Lines (2015) with Jacqui Abbott
 Crooked Calypso (2017) with Jacqui Abbott
 Manchester Calling (2020) with Jacqui Abbott
 N.K-Pop (2022) with Jacqui Abbott

References

1962 births
Living people
English male singers
English songwriters
English male singer-songwriters
English socialists
English pop rock singers
People from Bromborough
The Housemartins members
Go! Discs Records artists
Mercury Records artists
Proper Records artists
Deltiologists
British male songwriters
English republicans